Liguasan Marsh is a marsh in the Mindanao River basin in the southern island of Mindanao, Philippines.

The marsh covers an area of around  spanning the provinces of Cotabato, Maguindanao and Sultan Kudarat.  of this area is reserved for a game refuge and bird sanctuary

At least 92 species of birds, dozens of fish species, six species of reptiles and five species of amphibians are recorded to live in the area. The marshland is the only area in the Philippines where the Comb-crested Jacana can be sighted according to the Haribon Foundation. The place is also one of the few places in the country where there are populations of the Philippine crocodile and the Estuarine crocodile, and in the forested area of the march, the Philippine eagle.

References

Marshes of the Philippines
Landforms of Cotabato
Landforms of Maguindanao del Norte
Landforms of Maguindanao del Sur